Cnemaspis magnifica is a species of diurnal, rock-dwelling, insectivorous gecko endemic to the Western Ghats of South India. It is distributed in Sakleshpur hills in southwestern Karnataka.

References

 Cnemaspis magnifica

magnifica
Reptiles of India
Reptiles described in 2020